Qanat-e Hajji Taji (also Romanized as Qanāt-e Ḩājjī Tājī; also known as Qanāt-e Ḩājitājī) is a village and commercial hub in the Qaravolan Rural District, Loveh District, Galikash County, Golestan Province, Iran. At the 2006 census, its population was 206, in 54 families.

References 

Populated places in Galikash County